Juridicum is a stop on the Bonn Stadtbahn in Bonn, Germany. Stadtbahn lines passing through this station are: 16, 63, 66, 67 and 68.

The station, Juridicum, is located on Adenauerallee, the city's main thrufare, between a prominent school building and the campus of the university's School of Law and Economics. The station was named after the main Law School building, Juridicum. The secondary school across the street bears the name of the composer, Ludwig van Beethoven, who was born in Bonn. Signs in the station itself read simply Juridicum. The station consists of a mezzanine level and two side platforms beneath it, each 100 meters long. The station is popular both with Law school students and students of the secondary school, Beethoven-Gymnasium.

When the station was opened in 1975, the color scheme of the station was blue, following the original design by renowned architect Alexander von Branca.

References

Buildings and structures in Bonn
Railway stations in North Rhine-Westphalia
Tram transport in Germany
Cologne-Bonn Stadtbahn stations
Railway stations in Germany opened in 1975